"Loco" is a song recorded by South Korean girl group Itzy for their first Korean studio album Crazy in Love. It was released as the lead single on September 24, 2021, by JYP Entertainment. An English version was also included in the album. The lyrics were written by Star Wars (Galactika), and the music was composed by Star Wars (Galactika), Atenna (Galactika), and Woo Bin (Galactika), and arranged by Team Galactika. The English version was written by Star Wars (Galactika) and Sophia Pae.

Background and release
On August 13, 2021, JYP Entertainment announced that Itzy would be releasing their first studio album titled Crazy in Love on September 24, with "Loco" announced as the lead single. On September 7, the group teaser photo was released. On September 20, a highlight medley teaser video was released. On September 22, the music video teaser was released. The song along with the music video was released on September 24.

The Japanese version of "Loco" was released as digital single on December 1, 2021. The Japanese lyrics were written by Jun.

Composition
"Loco" was written by Star Wars (Galactika), composed by Star Wars (Galactika), Athena (Galactika), and Woo Bin (Galactika), and arranged by Team Galactika. The English version was written by Star Wars (Galactika) with Sophia Pae. "Loco" was composed in the key of C-sharp major, with a tempo of 102 beats per minute.

Commercial performance
"Loco" debuted at position 97 on South Korea's Gaon Digital Chart in the chart issue dated September 19–25, 2021. The song also debuted at position 7, 172, and 57 on Gaon Download Chart, Gaon Streaming Chart, and Gaon BGM Chart, respectively, in the chart issue dated September 19–25, 2021. The song then ascended to position 26 and 31 on Gaon Digital Chart and Gaon Streaming Chart, respectively, in the chart issue dated October 3–9, 2021. The song debuted at position 44, 27, and 4 on Billboards Global 200, K-pop Hot 100, and World Digital Song Sales, respectively, in the chart issue dated October 9, 2021. The song debuted at position 5 on Singapore's RIAS's Top Streaming Chart in the chart issue dated September 24–30, 2021. The song also debuted at position 4 on RIAS Top Regional Chart in the chart issue dated September 24–30, 2021.

Promotion
Prior to the album's release, on September 24, 2021, Itzy held a live event called "ITZY #OUTNOW COMEBACK SHOW" on Naver Now to introduce the album and communicate with their fans. Following the release of the album, the group performed "Loco" on four music programs: KBS2's Music Bank on September 24, MBC's Show! Music Core on September 25, SBS's Inkigayo on September 26, and Mnet's M Countdown on September 30. The group also performed on The Kelly Clarkson Show on September 27.

Credits and personnel
Credits adapted from Melon.

Studio
 JYPE Studios – recording, digital editing
 Galactika Studios – recording, editing
 Canton House Studios – mixing
 Sterling Sound – mastering

Personnel

 Itzy – vocals, background vocals
 Star Wars (Galactika) – Korean lyrics, composition, recording
 Athena (Galactika) – composition, digital editing, synthesizer, keyboard, bass
 Woo Bin (Galactika) – composition, synthesizer, keyboard, bass
 Team Galactika – arrangement
 Chang (Galactika) – drums, keyboard, bass
 Park Cella Kim – guitar
 Friday (Galactika) – background vocals, vocal directing
 e.NA (Galactika) – background vocals
 OGI (Galactika) – background vocals
 Sophia Pae – English lyrics, background vocals
 Aiden – background vocals
 Um Se-hee – recording, digital editing
 Park Eun-jung – recording
 Jaycen Joshua – mixing
 Jacob Richards – mixing (assistant)
 Mike Seaberg – mixing (assistant)
 DJ Riggins – mixing (assistant)
 Chris Gehringer – mastering

Accolades

Charts

Weekly charts

Monthly charts

Release history

Notes

References

2021 songs
2021 singles
Itzy songs
JYP Entertainment singles